Jockstrap are an English musical duo consisting of Georgia Ellery and Taylor Skye, who met at London's Guildhall School of Music & Drama in 2016. The duo's music combines Ellery's half-whispered vocals and string arrangements with Skye's electronic production.

Jockstrap released their first EP, Love Is the Key to the City, in 2018. After signing to Warp Records in early 2020, they released Wicked City in June 2020.

The band signed to Rough Trade Records in 2021 and have so far put out three singles under the label, namely "50/50", "Concrete Over Water", and "Glasgow", and a debut studio album, I Love You Jennifer B, released on September 9, 2022. Upon its release, the album gained critical acclaim.

Taylor Skye additionally works as a producer, and has produced tracks with Slowthai, Injury Reserve, and Sega Bodega, among others. Georgia Ellery is also a member of Black Country, New Road.

Members
Georgia Ellery – vocals, violin, guitar
Taylor Skye – production, synthesizers, keyboards, drum machines, programming, vocals

Discography

Studio albums
I Love You Jennifer B (2022, Rough Trade Records)

Extended plays
Love Is the Key to the City (2018, Kaya Kaya Records)
Lost My Key in the <3 Club <3 (2019, Kaya Kaya Records)
Wicked City (2020, Warp Records)
Beavercore (2020, Warp Records)

Singles
"Hayley" (2018)
"Charlotte" (2018)
"Acid" (2020)
"The City" (2020)
"50/50" (2021)
"Concrete Over Water" (2022)
"Glasgow" (2022)
"Greatest Hits" (2022)

References

English indie rock groups
English alternative rock groups
English noise rock groups
British musical duos
Warp (record label) artists